Malhama may refer to:

 Al-Malhama Al-Kubra, an apocalyptic great battle to occur at the end of times according to Islamic eschatology
 Malhama Tactical, a private military contractor in the Syrian Civil War